Tokyo Xtreme Racer Zero is a racing game developed by Genki for PlayStation 2. Despite its name, it is set between Tokyo Xtreme Racer 2 and Drift, and has enhanced sound and graphics. The game was released in Japan as Shutokou Battle 0, but was also a release in North America. The game was released in a PAL version in Europe and Australia under the title Tokyo Xtreme Racer (not to be confused with the Dreamcast title of the same name).

This is the first game in the series that has been released on a platform other than the Dreamcast. Zero was originally to be released on the Dreamcast but was then canceled and moved to the PlayStation 2. The Tokyo Xtreme Racer series has produced a total of six games, the first four being U.S. localizations of the first four Shutokou Battle series games and the final two being U.S. localizations of the first and third Kaido Battle series games.

Gameplay
The game does not make use of regular racing rules, instead, the game makes use of SP (Spirit Points) bars, consisting of "health bars" for the player and the rival each. The SP bar is decreased when one hits an obstacle or is behind their opponent. The one with their SP bar running out loses the battle. If the opposing vehicles take different routes, the battle will result in a draw.

The game has an in-game currency called CP. CP can be earned by doing battles with any rival, and can then be used to buy cars and parts.

The player's car performance can deteriorate should they decide not to take measures in which they drive slowly when they're not in a race, or decrease their boost level, especially when they're in a turbo car. However, if the player returns to the garage, the performance of their car will be reset.

The game has a list of 165 cars, all of which are unlicensed and have altered badges to avoid copyright.

Sequels
The hero defeats all the teams, the 13 Devils, "Speed King", and "Zodiac". The player is then challenged by "???", in a dark blue Fairlady Z S30Z (based on the Devil Z from Wangan Midnight) and defeats him as well.
The story is followed by the sequel Tokyo Xtreme Racer: Drift, in which an unknown rookie begins his career on touge roads instead. This was also followed by Tokyo Xtreme Racer 3, where many racers from Zero and Drift return with the addition of newer rivals in locations spanning from Tokyo, Nagoya, and Osaka.

Reception

Jeff Lundrigan reviewed the PlayStation 2 version of the game for Next Generation, rating it three stars out of five, and stated that "This series has its fans, and if we can understand the attraction, we don't share it."

The game was met with positive reception, as GameRankings gave it a score of 78.48%, while Metacritic gave it 76 out of 100. In Japan, Famitsu gave it a score of 34 out of 40.

References

External links
 

2001 video games
Cancelled Dreamcast games
Crave Entertainment games
PlayStation 2 games
PlayStation 2-only games
Tokyo Xtreme Racer
Ubisoft games
Genki (company) games
Interquel video games
Video games developed in Japan
Video games set in Tokyo
Multiplayer and single-player video games